Dhanusu Raasi Neyargale is a 2019 Tamil-language romantic comedy film written and directed by Sanjay Bharathi and produced by Gokulam Gopalan. The film stars Harish Kalyan, Digangana Suryavanshi (in her Tamil debut), and Reba Monica John in the lead roles. The music was composed by Ghibran with cinematography by PK Varma and editing by Kubendran. The film released on 6 December 2019.

Plot 
Arjun (Harish Kalyan) is an ardent believer of astrology that he steps out of his house at auspicious times, wears different-colored shirts suiting his star sign, and many such crazy things. His astrology guru Thirumandha (Pandiarajan) tells him that he should marry a Kanni Raasi (Virgo) girl who comes from another state so that his life will prosper. Despite the repeated matrimonial search, Arjun is unable to find his dream girl. Arjun meets K. R. Vijaya (Digangana Suryavanshi) in his ex-lover's wedding in Bangalore. They end up sleeping together. Anita (Reba Monica John) advises Arjun not to follow KRV as she is an independent aspiring astronaut who is going to Mars on a one-way mission. Later, KRV comes to Chennai for a seminar and ends up staying with Arjun. They gradually fall in love. KRV breaks up with him because he is insistent on following astrology and she is insistent on following astronomy. An ensuing drama follows. Arjun realizes that believing astrology is not wrong, but believing only in astrology is a mistake. He ends up engaged to Bhargavi (Raiza Wilson), who is later shown to be an ardent believer in astrology.

Cast 

Harish Kalyan as Arjun
Digangana Suryavanshi as K. R. Vijaya (KRV)
Reba Monica John as Anita
Yogi Babu as himself
Pandiarajan as Astrologer Thirumanandha
Ramdoss as Karuppasamy
Renuka as Pandiamma, Arjun’s mother
Charle as Ramasamy 
Ashvin Raja as Joseph 
TSK as Vijay
Haritha as Haasini
Daniel Annie Pope as Phillips
Samyuktha Shanmuganathan as Arjun's Boss
Pradeep K. Vijayan as Madhavan Nair
Vijaya Patti as Pandiamma's aunt
Raiza Wilson as Bhargavi (Baggy) (cameo appearance)
Masoom Shankar as Shwetha (cameo appearance)
Sangili Murugan as Arjun's grandfather (cameo appearance)
Abhishek Joseph George as Richard (cameo appearance)
Prithivee Rajesh as Arjun's date (cameo appearance)
Mayilsamy as Chinnakaalai (cameo appearance)
Sanjay Bharathi in a guest appearance

Production 
Sanjay Bharathi, son of director Santhana Bharathi, made his directorial debut with this film. He had narrated the story to his friend Harish Kalyan a few years ago and included him as part of the final cast.

Rhea Chakraborty signed on to play the film's female lead role in April 2019, but later left the project citing schedule clashes. She was replaced by fellow Hindi film actress Digangana Suryavanshi.

Soundtrack 
The soundtrack was composed by Ghibran. The first single, "I Want a Girl", was sung by Anirudh Ravichander and was released on 7 November 2019.

Release and reception 
The film had its theatrical release on 6 December 2019 and opened to generally negative reviews.

References 

2019 films
Indian romantic comedy films
Films scored by Mohamaad Ghibran
Films about superstition
2019 directorial debut films
2019 romantic comedy films
Films about astrology